Mapo may refer to:
Mapo District (마포구 / 麻浦區), a district of Seoul, South Korea
Mapo Station (마포역 / 麻浦驛), on the Seoul Metropolitan Subway, South Korea
MiG MAPO, a major Russian state-owned military aircraft manufacturer
Mapo doufu (麻婆豆腐), or tofu, a popular Chinese dish from Sichuan province
the MAPO (MAry POppins), train safety system used on the Walt Disney World Monorail System
Mapo (magazine), magazine published in Albania
Mapo, Beijing (马坡地区), area of Shunyi District
Mapo, Luchuan County (马坡镇), town in Luchuan County, Guangxi, China
Mapo, Xuzhou (马坡镇), town in Tongshan District, Xuzhou, Jiangsu, China
Mapo (fruit), a hybrid citrus fruit that was created by crossing a grapefruit with a mandarin
Mapo (Jurchen) (麻頗), Jurchen noble, a son of Wugunai